The Seminary of St. Pius X (Latin: Seminarium Sancti Pii Decimi), or St. Pius X Seminary (SPXS), is a Filipino Roman Catholic secondary school and seminary in the Lawaan hills, Roxas City, Capiz, in the Philippines, run by the Catholic priests of the Archdiocese of Capiz. The seminary and its surrounding areas comprise some three hectares of rocky hills. The late Cardinal Sin was the first rector of the school. In 1999, the college (Philosophy and Theology) of St. Pius X Seminary transferred to Cagay, Roxas City, Capiz, and named the school Sancta Maria, Mater et Regina, Seminarium (SMMRS) to honor the Blessed Virgin Mary. SPXS decided to retain and maintain its high school and pre-college until 2012, pre-college was transferred to SMMRS.

History

The erection of the Diocese of Capiz on 28 May 1951 brought a need to train priests. But the meager financial resources of the young diocese made the proposed project a difficult one, considering that the Bishop had no permanent residence yet. However, the late Bishop Antonio Frondosa, remained undaunted. Donors contributed to the Bishop's residence, and for the 3.3 hectare lot for the seminary site.  The first cornerstone of the Capiz Diocesan Seminary was laid on 13 August 1953, and the Bishop's residence was inaugurated on the same day. On 3 September 1953, feast of St. Pius X, the first half of the seminary was blessed by Auxiliary Bishop Teofilo Camomot and Archbishop Jose Ma. Cuenco. Bishop Frondosa issued circular No. 3/57 on 31 May 1957 announcing the opening of the new diocesan seminary and appointing Fr. Jaime Sin as its first rector.

Seven priests staffed the school in its first years with five lay teachers, and 33 seminarians. On completion, the seminary was blessed on 13 June 1959. Its curriculum, Classical Secondary Courses, was recognized by the Department of Education on 21 April 1961.

In 1999, the college (Philosophy and Theology) of St. Pius X Seminary transferred to Cagay, Roxas City, Capiz and named the school Sancta Maria, Mater et Regina, Seminarium (SMMRS) to honor the Blessed Virgin Mary. SPXS decided to retain and maintain its high school and pre-college.

Naming of Batches

St. Pius X is the patron saint of the school, but every section is obliged to have a corresponding patron saint. Batches who enter their first year with 36 or more seminarians are divided into two sections, hence, two patron saints per section. Fourth year seminarians are required to name their batch with a unique, notable name which they will carry on until college (SMMRS) or for the rest of their lives.

Seminary Formators

Diocesan Administrator: Very Rev. Msgr. Cyril B. Villareal, SThL-MA, MA

Rector: Very Rev. Fr. Berman D. Ibañez, SThL-MA

Vice Rector: Rev. Fr. John Egbert B. Dumali, JCL

Principal/Registrar: Rev. Fr. John Dave J. Eballa

Procurator & Prefect of Discipline: Rev. Fr. Andromel F. Ambag

Prefect of Discipline: Rev. Fr. Al Vincent S. Tumlos

Spiritual Director (SHS): Rev. Fr. Andrew D. Alcorano

Spiritual Director (JHS): Rev. Fr. Jonel D. Lamila

Spiritual Director (JHS) & Pastoral Director: Rev. Fr. Charryey Beltran

Pian Alumni Association
The St. Pius X Seminary Alumni Association, Inc. (Pian Alumni Association), or simply known as PIANS, is a non-profit and non-stock corporation whose membership is composed of all persons who have studied for at least one year in St. Pius X Seminary. It's not an ordinary alumni association because the seminary is not an ordinary educational institution created and incorporated solely under a national law, and regulated by the appropriate government agencies, such as the Philippines' Department of Education (DepED) and Education Service Contracting (ESC), but was also created under the laws of the Church and regulated by the Vatican, and administered by the bishop through his priests. Further, its purpose is not only to educate but also to train boys and young men for the presbytery and the future leaders of the Church.

Since the opening of the seminary  61 years ago, there are usually ordinations every year. Six Pians have become bishops. Though the association is composed of Pians (SPXS Alumni), it is not a religious or ecclesiastical organization or corporation like the Children of Mary, Knights of Columbus and Couples for Christ.

Notable alumni

Politics
 Eleandro "Budoy" Madrona – Congressman of Romblon (1992-2001, 2007-2016).
 Jocelyn Bolante – Politician who formerly served as an Undersecretary of the Department of Agriculture of the Philippines.
 Vicente "Vic" Bermejo – Former provincial governor of Capiz and former mayor of Roxas City.
Felipe Neri Yap – Mayor of Ivisan, Capiz.
 Gideon Ike Patricio – Former Mayor of the Municipality of Pilar
 Gerard Montojo – Mayor of the Municipality of Romblon.
 Arnold Perez - Mayor of the Municipality of Pilar, Capiz.

Church
 Jose F. Cardinal Advincula Jr. – Archbishop of Manila, Archbishop-emeritus of Capiz. 
 Most Rev. Victor B. Bendico, D.D. – Bishop of Baguio, Archbishop-designate of Capiz.
 Most Rev. Jose Corazon Tala-oc, D.D. – Bishop of Kalibo
 Most Rev. Warlito I. Cajandig, D.D. – Bishop of Vicar Apostolic of Calapan, Oriental Mindoro.
 Most Rev. Mel Rey Uy, D.D. – Bishop of Lucena 
 Fr. Erno Diaz – first Filipino Pastor in the Archdiocese of New York and now director of the Chapel of San Lorenzo Ruiz in New York City.

Others
 Atty. Florentino D. Mabasa Jr.- Outstanding Aklanon Awardee (2008)
 Geoffrey M. Martinez – President & CEO of CareHealth Plus Systems International Inc.
 Dr. Raymund O. Conlu M.D –  Nuclear Medicine, St. Luke's Medical Center, BGC.
 Capt. Donaldo "Don" Mendoza – Asst. Dir. Gen for CAAP.
  Michael Alfred V. Ignacio – Trade Diplomat/ Trade Representative and Director for Commercial Affairs. Manila Economic and Cultural Office, Taipei.
  Fernando V. Beup Jr. – DFA Director, Office of Strategy Planning and Policy Coordination, Formerly 2nd Secretary and Consul, Philippine Embassy in India.
  Melvin Cordenillo Almonguera. – 2nd Secretary and Consul, Philippine Embassy in Brunei.

Notable priest formators
 Jaime Cardinal Sin†, was a Roman Catholic Archbishop of Manila known for his instrumental role in the People Power Revolution, which toppled the regime of Ferdinand Marcos and installed Corazon Aquino as president of the Philippines. He was the first rector of St. Pius X Seminary.
 Most Rev. Raul Quimpo Martirez, D.D., JCL, STB, BSE, Bishop-Emeritus of San Jose de Antique and Outstanding Aklanon Awardee (2008)
 Most Rev. Vicente Navarra, D.D., Bishop of Roman Catholic Diocese of Bacolod.

See also
 List of Roman Catholic Seminaries
 Capiz
 Roxas City

References

Catholic seminaries
Educational institutions established in 1957
Education in Roxas, Capiz
Seminaries and theological colleges in the Philippines
Catholic secondary schools in the Philippines
1957 establishments in the Philippines